La Romagne is the name of the following communes in France:

 La Romagne, Ardennes, in the Ardennes department
 La Romagne, Maine-et-Loire, in the Maine-et-Loire department